The Ministry of Minerals is the government ministry of Tanzania which is responsible for facilitating the development of the mining sector.

History
The ministry was formed in 2017, when president John Magufuli ordered that the Ministry of Energy and Minerals be separated into two. The president aimed to help focus supervision in two of the most important sectors of the country's economy.  Angellah Kairuki was the first minister to serve in the Ministry.

References

M
Tanzania
Mining in Tanzania